Backbench was a panel cartoon appearing in The Globe and Mail. The strip was written and drawn by Graham Harrop. It consisted of multiple- and single-panel jokes, generally drawn from and satirizing Canadian politics.
Graham Harrop also has an editorial cartoon in The Vancouver Sun three days a weeks as well as publishing books and cards for special occasions. His award-winning comic strip Ten Cats appears daily online at Gocomics.

References

External links 
Records of Backbench and Graham Harrop are held by Simon Fraser University's Special Collections and Rare Books

Canadian comic strips
The Globe and Mail